The St. Luke Workhouse stood on City Road between Wellesley Terrace and Shepherdess Walk in what is today the London Borough of Hackney.

Initially, the workhouse was located on the north side of Featherstone Street, Bunhill Fields, it having opened in 1724. Being within part of the City of London parish of St Giles without Cripplegate, it fell under the control of two metropolitan authorities. The lease expired in 1782 and a second Local Act enabled the parish to build the new workhouse at a cost of £2,000.

Once built, the site consisted of wards, a workshop and a vestry hall.  It then fell within the Borough of Finsbury before boundaries were realigned.

St. Luke's became the Holborn and Finsbury Institution and then St. Matthews Hospital, when the site was converted to house sick patients.  World War II bomb damage destroyed the southernmost block, which was never fully repaired.

The vestry hall was sold to the London and Provincial Assurance Company before being demolished in the 1960s.

The hospital was closed in 1986. The workshops straddling Shepherdess Walk were renovated and are now modern apartments whilst the wards straddling Wellesley Terrace appear largely original, them too having been sold and converted to apartments.

The remainder of the site - the southern-end - is now a carpark.  The original perimeter wall and gates still stand, the initials ‘HJ’ and ‘SM’ still being present in the concrete and brick pillars.

References

London Borough of Hackney
Workhouses in London
History of the London Borough of Hackney